The JRA Award for Best Steeplechase Horse is a title awarded annually by the Japan Racing Association (JRA).
Since 1987 the honor has been part of the JRA Awards.

Records
Most successful horse (4 wins):
 Oju Chosan – 2016,2017,2018,2021

Winners

References

Horse racing in Japan: JRA Awards

Horse racing awards
Horse racing in Japan